Geography is the debut studio album by English musician Tom Misch. It was self-released on 6 April 2018 through Misch's own label Beyond the Groove.

Critical reception

Geography has received generally positive reviews from critics. At Metacritic, which assigns a normalised rating out of 100 to reviews from mainstream publications, the album received an average score of 73, based on 11 reviews.

Track listing

Notes
"Before Paris" contains a spoken word sample from a 2011 interview with jazz trumpeter Roy Hargrove.
"Isn't She Lovely" is a cover of the song of the same name by Stevie Wonder.
"Man Like You" is a cover of the song of the same name by Patrick Watson.
"Water Baby" contains a sample of "My Lady", written by Wilton Felder and performed by The Crusaders.

Personnel
Credits adapted from liner notes.

Musicians
 Tom Misch – vocals , guitar , instrumentation 
 GoldLink – vocals 
 De La Soul – vocals 
 Poppy Ajudha – vocals 
 Loyle Carner – vocals 
 Polly Misch – spoken word vocals 
 Abbey Smith – additional vocals 
 Jessica Carmody Nathan – additional vocals 
 Jaz Karis – additional vocals 
 Roy Hargrove – spoken word vocal sample 
 Jamie Houghton – drums 
 Tobie Tripp – violin 
 Johnny Woodham – trumpet 
 Reuben James – piano 
 Paul Castelluzzo – guitar 
 Rob Araujo – additional keyboard 

Technical personnel
 Tom Misch – production, mixing
 Lexxx – mixing
 Lewis Hopkin – mastering
 Jarami – co-production 
 Carol Misch – artwork

Charts

Certifications

References

2018 debut albums
Tom Misch albums
Self-released albums